Anne-Marie Barat (20 June 1948 – 21 December 1990) was a French classical organist.

Biography 
Born in Fontainebleau, Barat attended the Conservatoire de Paris where she studied with Henri Challan, Norbert Dufourcq, Pierre Revel, Georges Dandelot, Alain Weber, Marcel Bitsch and Elsa Barraine. In 1970 she joined the organ class of Rolande Falcinelli, which she graduated with distinction. Winner of the writing and erudition classes, she also obtained a first organ prize unanimously in 1976. She has been studying the organ since 1970 with André Marchal. Also a pianist, she was a pupil of Vlado Perlemuter and Marcel Ciampi.

She taught at the Conservatories of Fontainebleau and Marly-le-Roi. Her students included Éric Lebrun and Emmanuel Le Divellec. Since 1987 she had been professor at the Fontainebleau Schools. She performed at numerous concerts at home and abroad.

Barat died in a traffic accident on 21 December 1990.

References

External links 
 Anne-Marie Garat (Grandes Orges de Chartres)
 Anne-Marie Barat organist (1948–1990)

French classical organists
Women organists
Conservatoire de Paris alumni
People from Fontainebleau
1948 births
1990 deaths
Road incident deaths in France
20th-century organists
20th-century classical musicians